Patagopteryx is an extinct monotypic genus of patagopterygiforms that lived during the Late Cretaceous, around 80 mya, in what is now the Sierra Barrosa in northwestern Patagonia, Argentina. About the size of a chicken, it is the earliest known unequivocal example of secondary flightlessness: its skeleton shows clear indications that the ancestors of Patagopteryx were flying birds.
 
Located in strata of the Santonian Bajo de la Carpa Formation, the original remains were discovered by Oscar de Ferrariis, Director of the Natural History Museum of the Comahue National University in Neuquén around 1984–5. He passed them onto noted paleontologist José Bonaparte, who described the species Patagopteryx deferrariisi in 1992.

Characteristics
The Patagopteryx had feet with fused bones, much like modern birds. The bird did not have a wishbone, meaning that it would have been impossible for it to have had the muscles necessary for flying. The legs had very short femurs, characteristic of a running animal. The second toe has a curved claw, but it does not appear to have been used as a weapon. It was omnivorous, and probably traveled in flocks across the plains of South America.

See also

 Origin of birds

References

Bird genera
Cretaceous birds of South America
Cretaceous Argentina
Fossils of Argentina
Bajo de la Carpa Formation
Fossil taxa described in 1992
Taxa named by José Bonaparte
Prehistoric euornitheans